Happening is a 2021 French drama thriller film directed by Audrey Diwan from a screenplay by Diwan and Marcia Romano, based on the 2000 novel of the same name by Annie Ernaux. The film stars Anamaria Vartolomei and Luàna Bajrami and is set to be distributed by Wild Bunch.

Set in 1963 France, Anne, a young and talented student, gets pregnant, seeing her opportunities to finish her studies and excel slipping away from her. As her final exams approach and her social life begins to fade, Anne's pregnancy progresses, forcing her to confront the shame and pain of an abortion, even if she must risk prison to do so.

It was selected to world premiere in competition at the 78th Venice International Film Festival on 6 September 2021, where the film won the Golden Lion and received universal acclaim from critics.

Plot
In 1963 France, Anne is a promising university student at Angoulême. Despite having several close friends she is often ridiculed by other students for supposedly being promiscuous.

While visiting her family in the country Anne goes to see her doctor. Despite insisting she is still a virgin the doctor informs her she is pregnant. Anne begs him to do something about the pregnancy and he refuses, insisting what she is asking is illegal. 

Anne goes to see a random doctor in the city and also asks him for help with an abortion. He prescribes her a shot promising her it will induce a miscarriage. When it fails Anne begins to search for a doctor to perform the procedure. 

Anne approaches a fellow classmate, Jean, for help, informing she is pregnant. When he insists he doesn't know anyone who can help her he propositions her for sex, insisting there is no risk since she is already pregnant.

Growing increasingly desperate Anne attempts to perform an abortion on herself with a knitting needle, which fails. She informs her friends she is pregnant and trying to have an abortion and they abandon her.

As her grades begin to suffer and her chance at graduating with honours begins to slip away Anne goes to see Maxime, her boyfriend. Having previously told by Anne she intended to have an abortion he is shocked to learn she is still pregnant. They fight and she returns to school.

Jean approaches Anne at night to introduce her to a female friend who has had an abortion. The friend gives her the number of a doctor explaining that the abortion will be painful and cost 400 francs upfront. Anne sells all her things to be able to afford the abortion.

The abortion takes place in a woman's apartment on her kitchen table. She inserts a wand and tells Anne that she will start to miscarry in 24 hours. Anne fails to miscarry and returns to the abortionist who inserts a second wand inside Anne telling her it is possible there will be complications. Anne decides to go through with the procedure. Anne returns to her dorm where she has a complicated and painful miscarriage. Anne is found by a dorm mate who calls an ambulance taking her to the hospital. Her case is labelled a miscarriage.

Returning to school she takes her final exams.

Cast
 Anamaria Vartolomei as Anne
 Kacey Mottet Klein as Jean
 Sandrine Bonnaire as Gabrielle Duchesne
 Louise Orry-Diquero as Brigitte
 Louise Chevillotte as Olivia
 Pio Marmaï as Professeur Bornec
 Anna Mouglalis as Mme Rivière
 Fabrizio Rongione as Dr. Ravinsky
 Luàna Bajrami as Hélène
 Leonor Oberson as Claire
 Julien Frison as Maxime
 Alice de Lencquesaing as Laëtitia

Production
During an interview on 23 April 2019 about her directorial debut film Losing It, screenwriter Audrey Diwan revealed she was adapting Annie Ernaux's 2000 autobiographical novel L'événement (translated as Happening), stating that the book was "very important" to her. On 29 May 2020, the Centre national du cinéma et de l'image animée, an agency of the French Ministry of Culture, announced they would support the film, moving the project into pre-production.

Principal photography for the film commenced on 27 July 2020 and took place throughout the summer. The film entered post-production in January 2021.

Release
The film had its world premiere in competition at the 78th Venice International Film Festival on 6 September 2021. Prior to, Wild Bunch acquired distribution rights to the film for France in July 2021. Happening screened in the Spotlight section of the 2022 Sundance Film Festival.

Reception

Critical response
On the review aggregator website Rotten Tomatoes, 99% of 161 critics' reviews are positive, with an average rating of 8.5/10. The website's consensus reads, "A tough but rewarding watch, Happening puts a personal face on an impossibly difficult choice and its heart-rending aftermath." Metacritic, which uses a weighted average, assigned the film a score of 86 out of 100 based on 36 critics' reviews, indicating "universal acclaim."

Guy Lodge, writing for Variety, praised the film's acting, particularly that of Anamaria Vartolomei's in the lead role that was described as "career-elevating". The Guardians film festival critic Xan Brooks called the film "serious, gripping and finally honourable" and commended the cinematography of Laurent Tangy, saying that "the picture's tight framing is like a noose around her neck".

Accolades

See also 
 List of French films of 2021

References

External links
 
 
 

2021 drama films
Films about abortion
Films about education
Films about sexism
Films about sexuality
Films about sexual repression
Films about society
Films about students
Films based on autobiographies
Films based on French novels
Films based on works by Annie Ernaux
Films set in 1963
Films set in France
Films set in universities and colleges
French drama films
French films based on actual events
Golden Lion winners
Wild Bunch (company) films
2020s feminist films
2020s French films